Suger (1081 – 13 January 1151) was a French abbot, statesman, and historian. He once lived at the court of Pope Calixtus II in Maguelonne, France. He later became abbot of St-Denis, and became a close confidant to King Louis VII, even becoming his regent when the king left for the Second Crusade. Together with the king, he played a part in the centralization in the growing French Kingdom. He authored writings on abbey construction and was one of the earliest patrons of Gothic architecture and is seen as widely credited with popularizing the style.

Life 
Suger's family origins are unknown. Several times in his writings he suggests that his was a humble background, though this may just be a topos or convention of autobiographical writing. In 1091, at the age of ten, Suger was given as an oblate to the abbey of St. Denis, where he began his education. He trained at the priory of Saint-Denis de l'Estrée, and there first met the future king Louis VI of France. From 1104 to 1106, Suger attended another school, perhaps that attached to the abbey of Saint-Benoît-sur-Loire. In 1106 he became secretary to the abbot of Saint-Denis. In the following year he became provost of Berneval in Normandy, and in 1109 of Toury. In 1118, Louis VI sent Suger to the court of Pope Gelasius II at Maguelonne (at Montpellier, Gulf of Lyon), and he lived from 1121 to 1122 at the court of Gelasius's successor, Calixtus II.

On his return from Maguelonne, Suger became abbot of St-Denis. Until 1127, he occupied himself at court mainly with the temporal affairs of the kingdom, while during the following decade he devoted himself to the reorganization and reform of St-Denis. In 1137, he accompanied the future king, Louis VII, into Aquitaine on the occasion of that prince's marriage to Eleanor of Aquitaine, and during the Second Crusade served as one of the regents of the kingdom (1147–1149). He bitterly opposed the king's divorce, having himself advised the marriage. Although he disapproved of the Second Crusade, he himself, at the time of his death, had started preaching a new crusade.

Suger served as the friend and counsellor to both Louis VI and Louis VII. He urged the king to destroy the feudal bandits, was responsible for the royal tactics in dealing with the communal movements, and endeavoured to regularize the administration of justice. He left his abbey, which possessed considerable property, enriched and embellished by the construction of a new church built in the nascent Gothic style. Suger wrote extensively on the construction of the abbey in Liber de Rebus in Administratione sua Gestis, Libellus Alter de Consecratione Ecclesiae Sancti Dionysii, and Ordinatio. In the 1940s, the prominent art-historian Erwin Panofsky claimed that the theology of Pseudo-Dionysius the Areopagite influenced the architectural style of the abbey of St. Denis, though later scholars have argued against such a simplistic link between philosophy and architectural form. Similarly the assumption by 19th century French authors that Suger was the "designer" of St Denis (and hence the "inventor" of Gothic architecture) has been almost entirely discounted by more recent scholars. Instead he is generally seen as having been a bold and imaginative patron who encouraged the work of an innovative (but now unknown) master mason.

A chalice once owned by Suger is now in the collections of the National Gallery of Art in Washington, D.C.

Contribution to art 

Abbot Suger, friend and confidant of the French Kings Louis VI and Louis VII, decided in about 1137 to rebuild the great Church of Saint-Denis, the burial church of the French monarchs.

Suger began with the West front, reconstructing the original Carolingian façade with its single door. He designed the façade of Saint-Denis to be an echo of the Roman Arch of Constantine with its three-part division and three large portals to ease the problem of congestion. The rose window above the West portal is the earliest-known such example, although Romanesque circular windows preceded it in general form.

At the completion of the west front in 1140, Abbot Suger moved on to the reconstruction of the eastern end, leaving the Carolingian nave in use. He designed a choir (chancel) that would be suffused with light. To achieve his aims, his masons drew on the several new features which evolved or had been introduced to Romanesque architecture, the pointed arch, the ribbed vault, the ambulatory with radiating chapels, the clustered columns supporting ribs springing in different directions and the flying buttresses which enabled the insertion of large clerestory windows.

The new structure was finished and dedicated on 11 June 1144, in the presence of the King. The Abbey of Saint-Denis thus became the prototype for further building in the royal domain of northern France. It is often cited as the first building in the Gothic style. A hundred years later, the old nave of Saint-Denis was rebuilt in the Gothic style, gaining, in its transepts, two spectacular rose windows.

Suger was also a patron of art. Among the liturgical vessels he commissioned are a gilt eagle, the Eleanor of Aquitaine vase, the King Roger decanter, a gold chalice and a sardonyx ewer.

Writings 

Suger became the foremost historian of his time. He wrote a panegyric on Louis VI (Vita Ludovici regis), and collaborated in writing the perhaps more impartial history of Louis VII (Historia gloriosi regis Ludovici). In his Liber de rebus in administratione sua gestis, and its supplement Libellus de consecratione ecclesiae S. Dionysii, he treats of the improvements he had made to St Denis, describes the treasure of the church, and gives an account of the rebuilding. Suger's works served to imbue the monks of St Denis with a taste for history and called forth a long series of quasi-official chronicles.

References and sources
References

Sources

"Suger", The Middle Ages, A Concise Encyclopedia, H.R. Loyn Editor, 1989
 Abbot Suger of St. Denis: Church and State in Early Twelfth-Century France. Grant, Lindy. Essex, UK: Addison Wesley Longman Limited, 1998.; 
 The Gothic Cathedral: Origins of Gothic Architecture & the Medieval Concept of Order (Third Edition), Van Simson, Otto. Princeton, New Jersey: Princeton University Press, 1988. Bollingen Series XLVIII..
 "Suger, Abbot of Saint-Denis" Encyclopedia of Aesthetics, ed. Michael Kelly, 2nd ed., 6 v. (Oxford University Press, Oxford, 2014) v.6, p. 78-79

See also
 Gothic cathedrals and churches

Further reading
.
 .
 .
 .
 .

1080s births
1151 deaths
Burials at the Basilica of Saint-Denis
12th-century French historians
French abbots
Medieval French architects
French expatriates in England
12th-century architects
French male writers
12th-century Latin writers
12th-century French writers